Indiana Dunes State Park is an Indiana State Park located in Porter County, Indiana, United States,  east of Chicago. The  Dunes Nature Preserve makes up the bulk of eastern part of the park, and includes most of the park's hiking trails and dune landscape. This was one of the first places Richard Lieber considered when establishing the Indiana State Park system. Like all Indiana state parks, there is a fee for entrance. Indiana Dunes State Park was established in 1925 and designated a National Natural Landmark in 1974.

Preserving the Indiana Dunes has resulted from the efforts of many citizens and politicians. In 2018–2019, Indiana Dunes was the most-visited state park, with more than 1.3 million visitors.

Geology
The beaches were formed by winds coming off Lake Michigan, which drop sand when the wind hits plants, dunes, and hills. As the lake level of Lake Michigan dropped at the end of the Ice Age, the shoreline receded, and new dunes were formed along the lakeshore. Vegetation took over the previous dunes, and eventually forests grew on top of them. There are "blowouts" along the dunes, where dead stumps were revealed after the wind blew away the sand from on top of them; the most notable such blowout is Big Blowout.

History

Native Americans used the area for years, primarily the Potawatomi and Miami people. The Dunes were along trade routes used by Native Americans.  In the early 19th century, the state park area was home to the settlements of Petit Fort and City West.

Notable attractions 

 Sand dunes
 Singing sand
 Smelt fishing
 Haunted shores (Diana of the Dunes)
 Birding
 Hiking

Facilities and activities 
 Swimming and sunbathing: A small portion of the shoreline is set aside as a public swimming beach and is protected by lifeguards between Memorial and Labor Day weekends. It is a clean, all sand beach. The remainder of the beach (approximately ) is open for sunbathing, beach combing, and other similar activities. Dogs are permitted on the non-swimming portion of the beach, so long as they are kept on a short leash and any feces is promptly and safely removed from the shores.
 Beach house with concessions during summer season.
 Observation platform near the top of Mt. Tom. Looking west, Chicago can be seen above the forested sand dunes. Gary, Indiana, is also visible.
 Birdwatching: (A bird observation tower is located along Trail 10 overlooking a marsh community.)
 The Nature Center is a year-round facility that has a wildlife observation window, library, and a large auditorium. An interpretive naturalist provides public hikes and programs.
 Picnic Shelters

 Hiking trails extend for 16 miles (26 km), some of which pass not only the sand dunes, but also historic structures and wet prairie.
 Guided hiking tours
 Cycling is not permitted everywhere within the park, but the Calumet Trail runs through the park and provides cycling opportunities in the park as well as access to Indiana Dunes National Park and some neighboring communities.
 Interpretive Naturalist Service
 Arts and crafts
 The campground was totally rebuilt in 2004. It has 140 campsites laid out on sand with new, level, asphalt pads, 50-amp electrical hook-ups, and picnic tables. Drinking water hydrants are located throughout the campground. The roads were newly laid out and paved in 2004, and are arranged in several connecting loops. Most of the trees were spared during the rebuilding so that many sites have full or partial shade. There are two large newly built shower house/restroom structures. There is a short, level forest path to the swimming beach.

Dunes Nature Preserve

The Nature Preserve covers the eastern 2/3 of the state park, . It is accessible only on foot. All eight of the park's trails enter the nature preserve, offering easy to rugged experiences amongst the dunes. The highlights of the preserve include:
 Beach House Blowout and Furnessville Blowout.
 The Marsh with a bird observation tower.
 Trails
 Trail 8 goes up and over all three of the high dunes.
It begins at the Pavilion and Bathhouse, traveling east along the open beach. About  down the beach, is the Beach House Blowout. An additional  further is the Furnessville Blowout. At about half way is the eastern boundary of the park, at which point the trail enters the dunes through an area called Paradise Valley. From there, the trail parallels a branch of the Dunes Creek, passing through the Pinery and along the marsh. The Bird Observation Tower is accessible from this trail. About  from the Observation Tower, the trail ends at the Nature Center.

Designated a National Natural Landmark in 1974, the preserve also contains the Ancient Pines Nature Area, a prehistoric forest now exposed by dune blowouts.

Blowouts
Blowouts are formed by the on-shore winds of Lake Michigan. The winds move sand and pile it into dunes. As the dunes form, plants begin to take hold, stabilizing the sand. Beach grasses form a large underground system of roots. This root system, creates stable areas of sand, from which the dune can grow. Slowly other plants take root in the protected areas, including bearberry (kinnikinnick) and small evergreens. Over time, larger plants like sumac, sand cherry, cottonwood, and juniper take hold and replace the grasses and smaller plants.

When a nick forms in this armor of roots and plants, the area can become a blowout. First, open sand becomes accessible to the wind. This can be by animal trails or by human footpaths. A tree could fall in a strong wind, exposing the underlying sand. When this happens, the wind once again works on the loose sand. It undercuts the other roots, and begins moving sand southward. If the winds are strong enough or given enough time, a large blowout can occur, reducing the dunes to lake level over a large area. The 3 largest blowouts in the park are Beach House, Furnessville, and Big Blowout. Each extends into the interdunes, between the front rides of dunes and pockets, into the interdunal troughs. Big Blowout has uncovered an area of dead tree trunks known as the Tree Graveyard.

The park also has a Youth Tent Area separate from the public campground.

See also
 List of Indiana state parks
Save the Dunes

References

External links 

 Indiana Dunes State Park DNR Site
 Dunes Nature Preserve Indiana DNR Site
 The Prairie Club
Friends of the Indiana Dunes
Duneland.com
 Dunes Learning Center

Protected areas established in 1925
State parks of Indiana
National Natural Landmarks in Indiana
Protected areas of Porter County, Indiana
Dunes of the United States
Indiana Dunes National Park
Northwest Indiana
Nature centers in Indiana
Landforms of Porter County, Indiana